Lénora Guion-Firmin (born 7 August 1991 in La Trinité, Martinique) is a French athlete who competes in the sprint with a personal best time of 51.68 seconds at the 400 metres event.

Biography
Guion-Firmin won the silver medal at the 2012 European Athletics Championships in Helsinki at the 4×400 meter relay.

She competed for University of Tulsa and University of Maryland Eastern Shore. She twice earned All-America status in 2012, reaching the NCAA finals in the 400-meter dash in both indoor and outdoor.  She earned the same distinction in 2013, reaching the finals in the 400-meter dash in the NCAA Outdoor Championships.
In July 2013 Guion-Firmin captured three medals in the European Championships, U23.  She took gold in the 400 meters, silver in the 200 meters and was part of the bronze-medal winning 4x400 meter relay team.

References

External links 
 

1991 births
Living people
French female sprinters
French people of Martiniquais descent
European Athletics Championships medalists
World Athletics Championships athletes for France
European Games competitors for France
Athletes (track and field) at the 2019 European Games
Tulsa Golden Hurricane women's track and field athletes
University of Maryland Eastern Shore alumni
21st-century French women